|}

The Surrey Stakes is a Listed flat horse race in Great Britain open to horses aged three years only.
It is run at Epsom over a distance of 7 furlongs and 3 yards (1,411 metres), and it is scheduled to take place each year in late May or early June.

The race was first run in 1995, as the Vodacom Conditions Stakes.  It was given its current name and awarded Listed status in 1998.

Records

Leading jockey (2 wins):
Frankie Dettori – Iguazu Falls (2008), Shakespearean (2010)
Pat Eddery – Volontiers (1998), Jentzen (2001)
Kieren Fallon – Nicobar (2000), Rimrod (2003)
Jimmy Fortune – Racer Forever (2006), Smuggler's Moon (2016)Richard Hughes – Cybinka (1999), Producer (2012)Ryan Moore – Galeota (2005), Well Acquainted (2013)Silvestre de Sousa – Solomon's Bay (2017), Lake Volta (2018)Leading trainer (4 wins):
 Richard Hannon Sr. – Cybinka (1999), Jentzen (2001), Galeota (2005), Producer (2012)''

Winners

See also 
Horse racing in Great Britain
List of British flat horse races

References
Racing Post:

Flat races in Great Britain
Flat horse races for three-year-olds
Epsom Downs Racecourse
Recurring sporting events established in 1995
1995 establishments in England